Villasenoria is a genus of Mexican plants in the groundsel tribe within the daisy family.

The genus is named in honor of Mexican botanist José Luis Villaseñor Ríos.

Species
The only known species is Villasenoria orcuttii, native to southern Mexico (States of Veracruz, Oaxaca, Chiapas).

References

Senecioneae
Monotypic Asteraceae genera
Flora of Mexico